Karpani is a surname. Notable people with the surname include:

 Asoiva Karpani (born 1996), Australian rugby union footballer
 Simone Karpani (born 1997), Australian rugby league footballer